Saint-Gervais-sous-Meymont (Auvergnat: Sent Gervasi de Maimont) is a commune in the Puy-de-Dôme department in Auvergne in central France.

The commune is a member of Parc naturel régional Livradois-Forez and hosts the park's main information center.

See also
Communes of the Puy-de-Dôme department

References

Saintgervaissousmeymont